Piero Brandi (22 January 1939 – 22 November 2004) was an Italian boxer. He competed in the men's light welterweight event at the 1960 Summer Olympics.

References

1939 births
2004 deaths
Italian male boxers
Olympic boxers of Italy
Boxers at the 1960 Summer Olympics
Sportspeople from Arezzo
Light-welterweight boxers
20th-century Italian people